Vinicius da Cunha Munhoz (born 11 December 1978), known as Vinicius Munhoz, is a Brazilian football coach.

Career
Born in Santa Maria, Rio Grande do Sul, Munhoz started his career in 1999 as a fitness coach of Internacional de Santa Maria's under-20 squad. He later worked in the same role with the main squad before joining Grêmio in 2003, again as fitness coach.

In 2005, Munhoz was hired by the Brazilian Football Confederation to work as a fitness coach and assistant of Jorge Barcellos at the women's under-20 national team. Between 2007 and 2008 he worked at Esportivo as a fitness coach before rejoining Barcelos' staff at the women's national team for the 2008 Summer Olympics.

In 2009, Munhoz followed Barcelos to Saint Louis Athletica in Women's Professional Soccer, being later a technical coordinator at Fragata Futebol Clube. In 2013, after a stint back at Grêmio's under-20 squad as a fitness coach, he joined Audax's subsidiary teams: starting with Osasco FC's under-20s, he later managed Grêmio Osasco's under-20 and senior squads in 2014 before taking over Audax's first team in 2015.

Dismissed by Audax in late 2015, Munhoz was appointed in charge of Mirassol's under-20 squad for the 2016 campaign. After reaching the round of 32 of the year's Copa São Paulo de Futebol Júnior, he returned to Audax, being in charge of the club during the year's Série D.

On 1 November 2016, Munhoz returned to his first club Inter-SM, now named first team manager. He renewed his contract the following 1 July, but resigned on 15 June 2018 after accepting an offer from Ferroviária.

In December 2019, after Ferroviária's change of ownership, Munhoz was offered a board role, but opted to leave the club and joined Red Bull Brasil. The following 2 January, after Antônio Carlos Zago left to Kashima Antlers, Munhoz was named interim manager of Red Bull Bragantino.

References

External links
Soccer House profile 

1978 births
Living people
People from Santa Maria, Rio Grande do Sul
Brazilian football managers
Grêmio Osasco Audax Esporte Clube managers
Esporte Clube Internacional managers
Associação Ferroviária de Esportes managers
Red Bull Brasil managers
Red Bull Bragantino managers
Sportspeople from Rio Grande do Sul